Darab Farooqui (born 22 June 1975) is an Indian film writer. He has written Victory (2009), Tigers (2014), Dedh Ishqiya (2014) and the latest Notebook (2019). He will work with Karan Johar in his next movie.

Early life and education 

Darab was born on 22 June 1975 in Jaipur, Rajasthan to Shameem A Farooqui and Yasmeen Farooqui.

Darab completed his Bachelor degree from Rajasthan University as a distant learner. 
He also contributes to The Wire News. 

He had written Naam Shaheenbagh Hai, a short poem at the time of Shaheen Bagh protest.

References 

Indian screenwriters
Hindi screenwriters
Living people
1975 births
People from Jaipur